Kuala Lumpur Fashion Week, held in August in Kuala Lumpur, capital city of Malaysia, is a series of summer events (generally lasting five days) where international fashion collections are shown to buyers, the press and the general public.

Kuala Lumpur Fashion Week was created in 2013 as a platform for Malaysian designers to present and showcase their ready-to-wear collections, with the hopes of highlighting the strengths and creativity of Malaysia's Fashion Industry to local and international consumers. Kuala Lumpur Fashion Week is held at the Pavilion Kuala Lumpur in Malaysia in August and attracts more than 150,000 people. Kuala Lumpur Fashion Week is reserved for fashion professionals and can only be attended by invitation or accreditation. Journalists, bloggers, and buyers are accredited by the organizers of the event and the ready-to-wear brands who select any guests they choose to invite. Each year, organizers decide which five brands will present their collections while featuring a mix of other exciting designers. KLFW showcases designs never seen before, providing viewers with a first-hand look at designs.

History
KLFW was created by Mr. Andrew Tan, who was invited to an event in Buckingham Palace, London, for the Commonwealth Fashion Exchange, which encourages emerging designers to display their talents and showcase it to the world. Through support of Tourism Malaysia, Kuala Lumpur Fashion Week had its chance to travel the world. Kuala Lumpur Fashion Week involves ready-to-wear fashion. Ready-to-wear focuses on designing clothes that are immediately marketable. Months after KLFW you will find majority of the designs ready for purchase in stores.

2019 KLFW
Andrew Tan, the founder of KLFW, showcased batik as a contemporary element in fashion through the Fashion Forward Batik Initiative. Kit Woo's Utilitarian unisex collection consisting of abstract shapes, patchwork detailing and oversized fits in denim with a pop of color. Designers highlighted support for sustainable and ethical fashion aligning with Airasia, the Commonwealth Fashion Council of UK, and the United Nations' sustainable development goal.

References

2013 establishments in Malaysia
Recurring events established in 2013
Fashion events in Malaysia
Fashion weeks
August events
Fashion Week